Kateřina Dudková (born 1988) is a professional Czech triathlete, Czech U23 vice champion of the year 2009 and member of the young Czech elite team.

In 2007 Dudková started to take part in ITU and ETU competitions and placed fourth in two Junior European Cups, in the same year, at the age of 19, she also took part in an elite race and placed 33rd at the Premium European Cup in Poland.

In France Dudková represents the elite club SAS (= Saint-Avertin Sports) Triathlon 37.
In 2009 and in 2010 she took part in the prestigious French Club Championship Series Lyonnaise des Eaux. At the opening triathlon in Dunkirk (23 May 2010) she placed 39th, at the Triathlon de Paris (18 July 2010) 28th, at Tourangeaux (29 August 2010) 30th, thus being always the second best of her club. At the Grand Final in La Baule (Triathlon Audencia, 18 September 2010), Dudková did not finish the race.

Dudková lives in Holice v Cechach and represents the club Nový věk Triatlonu Trusnov.

ITU Competitions 
In the four years from 2007 to 2010, Dudková took part in 10 ITU competitions and achieved two top ten positions.

The following list is based upon the official ITU rankings and the Athlete's Profile Page. Unless indicated otherwise the following events are triathlons (Olympic Distance) and belong to the Elite category.

BG = the sponsor British Gas · DNF = did not finish · DNS = did not start

Notes

External links 
 Dudkova's ITU Profile Page
 Czech Triathlon Federation in Czech

Czech female triathletes
1988 births
Living people